Amy Matilda Williams Cassey (August 14, 1809–August 15, 1856) was an African American abolitionist, and was active with the Philadelphia Female Anti-Slavery Society. Cassey was a member of the group of elite African Americans who founded the Gilbert Lyceum, Philadelphia's first co-ed literary society. The society had more than forty registered members by the end of the first year.

Early life 
Amy Matilda Williams Cassey was born free into a prominent African American family, in New York City, to Sarah and Peter Williams, Jr. Her father founded and was the pastor of St. Phillips Black Episcopal Church in lower Manhattan. Cassey was involved in black newspapers and organizations in her early teens. She attended the African Free School for her education in New York City. 

In 1826 when Cassey was seventeen, she met and married an activist and businessman from Philadelphia named Joseph Cassey. After marrying, she moved with him to Philadelphia, settling into the historic Cassey House.

Activism 
Cassey was active in the Philadelphia Female Anti-Slavery Society which focused on providing access to opportunities for education, moral reform, and vocational training for the free black community living in Philadelphia. In 1841 Amy and Joseph Cassey along with Robert Douglass, Sr., Jacob White, Sr., John Bowers, Robert Purvis, Sarah Douglass, Hetty Burr, Grace Douglass, Harriet Purvis, and Amelia Bogle founded the Gilbert Lyceum. The Gilbert Lyceum was the first co-ed literary society for African American Philadelphians and included literary and scientific interests.

Friendship albums
From 1833 to 1856, Mary Wood Forten, Martina Dickerson, Mary Anne Dickerson, and Amy Cassey kept friendship albums in which they wrote poetry, essays, and painted metaphorical nature scenes. The albums circulated within a community of free people and abolitionists from Boston to Baltimore, who in turn contributed their own work. They shared entries focused on fighting oppression based on race and gender.

Later life 
Her husband Joseph Cassey died in 1848. Cassey then married Charles Lenox Remond in 1850. The two moved to Salem, Massachusetts where she continued to be active in civil rights and abolition. In 1853, Cassey brought a successful suit against the management of a Boston theater when she was wrongfully ejected. 

Cassey died on August 15, 1856 in Salem, Massachusetts.

See also
 Cassey House
 Philadelphia Female Anti-Slavery Society

References

External links
 Amy Matilda Williams Cassey at BlackPast.org
 Cassey House at BlackPast.org
 Amy Matilda Williams Cassey's Friendship Album at The Library Company of Pennsylvania

1809 births
1856 deaths
Activists for African-American civil rights
African-American abolitionists
People from New York City
African Free School alumni
People from Philadelphia
People from Salem, Massachusetts
African-American upper class